"King Andrew the First" is an American political cartoon created by an unknown artist around 1832. The cartoon depicts Andrew Jackson, the 7th United States president, as a monarch holding a veto bill and trampling on the Constitution and on internal improvements of the national banks.

Purpose
The political cartoon was first shown in 1832 in the Library of Congress and was a response to Jackson's veto against the United States national bank deposits in September. He is depicted as a monarch because opposers often viewed Jackson as an abuser of his presidential powers, not obeying the laws. The creator of the cartoon remained anonymous, but the cartoon reflected a Whig's point of view.

Historical usage
During the 1832 presidential election, "King Andrew the First" was used to support presidential campaigns opposing Jackson.

References

1833 works
Editorial cartoons
Caricature
American political satire
Cultural depictions of Andrew Jackson
Works of unknown authorship
Works published anonymously